The Outre-Forêt (Unteremwàld in Alsatian) is a natural region which is located in the very north of Alsace, bordering on Rhineland-Palatinate. Outre-Forêt means in French beyond the forest,
beyond the Haguenau Forest. To the north, it is bounded by the Bienwald as well as by the Lauter.
To the east, it is bounded by the Rhine and the Petit Ried. To the west, it is bounded by
the Northern Vosges and the River Falkensteinerbach. As a frontier zone off the beaten tracks,
the Outre-Forêt has managed to keep its traditions; numerous timbered houses can be admired,
pottery is well developed. Far away from the traditional Alsatian vineyards, grapes are grown here.

Geography 
The Outre-Forêt is bounded by the Haguenau Forest to the south, the Bienwald to the north,
the wooded Northern Vosges to the West, and by the Rhine to the east. In the east, there is also
the Petit Ried. The Outre-Forêt stretches between the  Lauter valley  and the sandy
alluvial fans of the  Sauer and Moder.

The area is characterized by slopes and hills, the altitude of which is modest. In Surbourg the altitude reaches 217 m over the sea level. To the west, the vineyard of Cleebourg shows a gentle
slope. The Benedictine monks of the Abbey of Wissembourg had already grown grapes in the Middle Age.
Unlike the adjacent forests and meadows, the Outre-Forêt is a region of arable land, which lends
itself to poly-culture thanks to its top layer made up of clay.

Language 

While the rest of Alsace speaks Alemannic, South Frankish is spoken in Outre-Forêt (in the Alsace bossue known as krummes Elsass in German, Frankish is spoken too, as in northern Lorraine).
Obviously, the official language remains French, as in whole France.

History 

The Maginot line, as in fort Schœnenbourg for instance, crossed the Outre-Forêt, the history of which
was turbulent. In Hatten there is a Musée de l'Abri (shelter museum).

Traditions 

When the Haguenau Forest was still an obstacle, and before cars ushered in a new era of mobility,
the region was isolated. Therefore, the Outre-Forêt managed to better keep its traditions alive than any other adjacent region.
During feasts (more precisely Streisselhochzeit in Seebach) the local folk costume is still worn.
In Kutzenhausen, the museum of local traditions endeavours to show the rural life at the beginning
of the 20th century.

Pottery has been being practised here since the Neolithic period.
Betschdorf is known for its grey and blue potteries. Grey is due to clay, whereas blue is due to cobalt.

Economy

The oil museum in Merkwiller-Pechelbronn shows the path-breaking work which was done in the region
in the field of oil industry. Today, the Hot-Dry-Rock process is applied in Soultz-sous-Forêts in order to tap into the Earth's heat.

References

Bibliography 
 Cercle d'histoire de l'Alsace du Nord, Journées portes ouvertes monuments historiques de l'Outre-Forêt, septembre 1991, 1991 (11 fiches sous pochette présentant des monuments à Lauterbourg, Soultz-Sous-Forêts, Altenstadt, Kutzenhausen, Preuschdorf, Wœrth et Walbourg)
 Cercle d'histoire de l'Alsace du Nord, Connaître et aimer l'Outre-forêt, circuits guidés, Delbecq, Reichshoffen, 1984, 211 p.
 Michel Charvet, Dessine-moi l'Alsace : l'Outre-Forêt, Éditions J.-P. Gyss, Barembach, Schirmeck, 1987, 101 p. 
 J.-M. Hauer, Inventaire des synagogues du pays de Hanau et d'Outre-Forêt, contribution à l'étude de leur architecture par quelques exemples détaillés, Strasbourg, 1985, 288 p. (mémoire d'Architecture)
 Claude Muller, L'Outre-Forêt au XVIIIe siècle, Éd. Coprur, Strasbourg, 2004, 240 p. 
 Daniel Peter, « Les ressources en eau de l'Outre-Forêt », in Outre-Forêt, 1987, n° 57, p. 4-9
 Daniel Peter, « La faune aquatique dans l'Outre-Forêt, au XIXe siècle », in Outre-Forêt, 1987, n° 57, p. 14-16
 Daniel Peter, Naître,vivre et mourir dans l'Outre-Forêt (1648-1848), Cercle d'histoire et d'archéologie de l'Alsace du Nord, Wissembourg, 1995, 285 p. (texte remanié d'une thèse d'Histoire moderne)
 Jean-Laurent Vonau (dir.), L'Outre-forêt dans la tourmente révolutionnaire, 1989, 277 p. (publié à l'occasion du Bicentenaire de la Révolution française)
 Elisabeth Weinling, Les anabaptistes d'Outre-Forêt 1700-1871, Université de Strasbourg 2, 1996 (mémoire d'Histoire)

Geography of Bas-Rhin